Gayathri Venkataraghavan is an Indian Carnatic vocalist.  She lives in Chennai.

Education
Venkataraghavan trained in Carnatic music at an early age under Rajalakshmi, Padma Veeraraghavan, Rukmini Ramani, V. Subramaniam and Lakshmi Natarajan. At a young age, as Gayatri Ramani, she won a number of prizes in inter-school and Inter-collegiate competitions as well as at competitions held by Music Academy and other sabhas including Indian Fine Arts Society, Mayilapore Fine Arts and Saraswati Vaggeyakara Trust.  Her advanced training started in 1990 under Acharya Choodamani Sri. A. Sundareshan, a disciple of Sri C. V. Krishnamurty Iyer, Sri Ramnad Krishnan, and Alathur Shri Shivasubramanya Iyer. She moved to Madurai / Tirunelveli after marriage. Although it witnessed a hiatus in her career, she successfully bounced back into the performing scene after eight years and continued her training under A. Sundareshan.  Gayathri later trained with P. S. Narayanaswamy (PSN), a disciple of Semmangudi Srinivasa Iyer, until PSN's death in October 2020.

Performances

The Hindu wrote that her singing shows "modesty and sincerity", and praised her for choosing rare kritis in a 2016 concert. In a 2015 concert, The Hindu wrote that she "comprehends the strong link between the devoutness of classical music and its manifestation in the form of kritis." They have also called her voice "melodious."

Discography
Her commercial albums have been released by Charsur Digital Workstation and other companies.

Awards and titles
 D. K. Pattammal Award for Lady Vocalist (2001)
 T. T. Rangaswamy Award (2002)
 Kalki Krishnamoorty Award (2003)
 Nada Oli title by Nada Inbam, Madras (2003)
 H. Natarajan Prize (2003, 2004)
 Carnatic Music Association of North America award
 Pappu Kamakshi Award (2006)
 MLV Endowment Award by  Narada Gana Sabha (2006)
 Isai Peroli title by Kartik Fine Arts (2008)
 Shanmukha Sangeeta Shironmani from Shanmukhananda Sabha (2008)

References

External links

 

Year of birth missing (living people)
Living people
Singers from Chennai
Women Carnatic singers
Carnatic singers
Indian women classical singers
21st-century Indian women singers
21st-century Indian singers
Women musicians from Tamil Nadu